Graham Frost (born 15 January 1947, in Old Basford) is an English former first-class cricketer active 1968–73 who played for Nottinghamshire.

References

External links

1947 births
English cricketers
Nottinghamshire cricketers
Living people
Marylebone Cricket Club cricketers
20th-century English people